Out of Order is a 1997 Hungarian comedy film directed by András Kern and Róbert Koltai.

Cast 
 András Kern - Péter Vitt
 Róbert Koltai - Sándor Galamb
 Sándor Gáspár - Béla Bakai
 Judit Hernádi - Bella Jakab
 Iván Kamarás - Róbert Marosi
 Ferenc Kállai - Hotel Manager
 Gábor Reviczky - József Rákóczi
 Dorottya Udvaros - Panni Vitt
 Kata Dobó - Tünde Marosi
 Zoltán Bezerédi - Extremist Politician

References

External links 

1997 comedy films
1997 films
Films based on works by Ray Cooney
Hungarian comedy films